Anashkin, female form Anashkina is a Russian surname. Notable people with the surname include:

 Sergei Anashkin (born 1961), Kazakhstani football player
 Yuliya Anashkina (born 1980), Russian luger

Russian-language surnames